Ross Case and Geoff Masters were the defending champions, but lost in the first round this year.

Marty Riessen and Sherwood Stewart won the title, defeating Mike Cahill and Terry Moor 6–4, 7–6 in the final.

Seeds

  Marty Riessen /  Sherwood Stewart (champions)
  Tim Gullikson /  Robert Lutz (first round)
  Ilie Năstase /  Tomáš Šmíd (semifinals)
  Ross Case /  Geoff Masters (first round)

Draw

Draw

External links
Draw

Tokyo Indoor
1979 Grand Prix (tennis)